The Battle of Adrianople (378 CE), in which Gothic rebels defeated the Eastern Roman Empire, was the main battle of the Gothic War (376–382).

Battle of Adrianople may also refer to:
Battle of Adrianople (324), a battle in which Constantine the Great defeated Licinius in a Roman civil war
Siege of Adrianople (378), an unsuccessful siege by the Goths following the Battle of Adrianople
Battle of Adrianople (718), a battle between an alliance of Bulgarians and Byzantines against the Umayyad Caliphate, during the Siege of Constantinople (717–718)
Battle of Adrianople (813), a successful Bulgarian siege of the Byzantine city
Battle of Adrianople (914), a battle between Bulgarians and Byzantines
Battle of Adrianople (972), a battle between Byzantines and Kievan Rus' led by Sviatoslav I of Kiev
Battle of Adrianople (1003), a battle between Bulgarians and Byzantines
Battle of Adrianople (1094), part of the revolt of Constantine Diogenes (pretender) and his Cuman allies
Battle of Adrianople (1205), part of the Fourth Crusade, in which the Bulgarians defeated the Crusaders
Battle of Adrianople (1226), part of the revolt of Theodore Komnenos Doukas
Battle of Adrianople (1254), in which the Byzantines defeated the Bulgarians
Battle of Adrianople (1305), a battle between the Byzantines and the Catalan Company
Battle of Adrianople (1355), a battle between the Byzantines and the Serbs led by Stefan Dušan
Battle of Adrianople (1365), in which the Ottoman Empire took the city from the Byzantine Empire
Battle of Adrianople (1829), in which the Russians seized the city from the Ottoman Empire
Siege of Adrianople (1912–1913), in which the Bulgarians took the city from the Ottomans in the First Balkan War

See also
 Adrianople
Battle of Tzirallum, a 313 CE battle in which Licinius defeated Maximinus Daia in a Roman civil war